Questions is an album by pianist Paul Bley recorded in Denmark in 1985 and released on the SteepleChase label.

Reception

Allmusic awarded the album 4 stars, stating: "The more normal sounding trio recordings towards the front of the disc sound almost out of place, but the rest of Questions is Bley at his tranquil but never placid best."

Track listing
All compositions by Paul Bley
 "Lovely" - 6:14  
 "Adventure 1" - 2:09  
 "Adventure 2" - 2:30  
 "Adventure 3" - 1:33  
 "Adventure 4" - 3:16  
 "Beautiful" - 5:07  
 "The Pause is Not Rhythmic" - 4:09 Bonus track on CD  
 "Questions" - 2:40  
 "Here and Gone 1" - 4:45  
 "Here and Gone 2" - 2:18  
 "Here and Gone 3" - 3:36  
 "Here and Gone 4" - 1:58  
 "Fanfare" - 7:03

Personnel 
Paul Bley - piano
Jesper Lundgaard - bass 
Aage Tanggaard - drums

References 

1985 albums
Paul Bley albums
SteepleChase Records albums